Joey McGuire (born August 6, 1971) is an American football coach. He is the head football coach at Texas Tech University, a position he had held since the 2022 season. McGuire previously served as the associate head coach and outside linebackers coach at Baylor University. Prior to Baylor, he was a head coach at the high school level in Texas, where he won a trio of state championships to go along with numerous bi-district and district championships.

Coaching career

High school coaching
McGuire began his coaching career at his alma mater Crowley High School in Texas as the defensive line coach. He went on to coach at Cedar Hill High School as their secondary coach in 1997 under former Crowley coach Robert Woods before being promoted to the school's head coach in 2003. At Cedar Hill, McGuire took on a program that had not recorded a winning season in years and had never won a playoff game. As head coach from 2003 through 2016, McGuire went 141-42 and led the Longhorns to four state-championship games, winning in 2006, 2013 and 2014 and finishing runner-up in 2012. His teams won seven district titles, nine bi-district championships, and appeared in the playoffs in 12 straight years.

Baylor
McGuire was hired as the tight ends coach at Baylor in 2017 under first-year head coach Matt Rhule. He was promoted to associate head coach in 2019 and reassigned to coach the defensive ends. He served as the program's interim head coach when Rhule left to accept the Carolina Panthers coaching position in 2020. After Dave Aranda was named Baylor's head coach on January 16, 2020, McGuire was retained as associate head coach and shifted to outside linebackers coach.

Texas Tech
McGuire was reported to have been scheduled to interview for the open head coaching position at Texas Tech in 2021.

McGuire was officially named the 17th head coach in Texas Tech program history on November 8, 2021.

2022 Season
In his first season as head coach of the Red Raiders, McGuire defeated both the Texas Longhorns and Oklahoma Sooners in the same season, a program first. The Red Raiders finished 4th in the Big 12, with McGuire overseeing Texas Tech’s first winning season in conference play since 2009. The Red Raiders finished 8-5 in his first season as head coach.

Personal life 
McGuire and his wife Debbie have a daughter, Reagan, and a son, Garret. Garret was a former quarterback at Baylor and former coaching assistant for the Carolina Panthers, and is now the current wide receivers coach for the Nebraska Cornhuskers under Rhule.

Head coaching record

College

References

External links
 
 Texas Tech profile
 Baylor profile

1970 births
Living people
Baylor Bears football coaches
Texas Tech Red Raiders football coaches
High school football coaches in Texas
University of Texas at Arlington alumni
People from Crowley, Texas
Coaches of American football from Texas